The following list of place names with royal patronage in the United Kingdom includes both those granted a royal title or status by express wish of a specific monarch, and those with prefixes or suffixes such as "King's" or "Regis" that relate to historic ownership of the area by the Crown.

England

Royal
The following places have been explicitly granted or confirmed the use of the title "royal" by royal charter, letters patent or similar instrument issued by the monarch. Since 1926 the entitlement to the title "royal borough" has been strictly enforced. Devizes in Wiltshire, which had previously used the title without authorisation, was forced to end the practice.

Former
 Royal Liberty of Havering – abolished in 1892.

Regis

Regis,  Latin for "of the king", occurs in numerous placenames. This usually recalls the historical ownership of lands or manors by the Crown. The "Regis" form was often used in the past as an alternative form to "King's", for instance at King's Bromley and King's Lynn.

Examples include Houghton Regis in Bedfordshire, Salcombe Regis in Devon, Bere Regis, Melcombe Regis and Lyme Regis in Dorset, Milton Regis in Kent, Beeston Regis in Norfolk, Grafton Regis in Northamptonshire, Brompton Regis in Somerset, Newton Regis in Warwickshire and Rowley Regis in the West Midlands.

There is one modern example of the granting of the suffix "regis". In 1929, George V, having spent several months recuperating from a serious illness in the seaside resort of Bognor, West Sussex, allowed it to be renamed as "Bognor Regis".

King's

Kingham
Kingsbury
Kingsclere
King's Cliffe
King's Cross
King's Heath
Kingskerswell
Kings Langley
King's Lynn
King's Norton
King's Sutton
Kings Tamerton
Kings Worthy
Kingstanding
Kingsteignton
Kingston by Ferring
Kingston upon Hull
Kingston upon Thames
Kingswear
Kingswinford
Kingswood, Surrey
Winterborne Kingston
Kingsthorpe, Northampton

Somerset
Kingsbridge
Kingsbury Episcopi
Kingsdon
 Kingston Bridge
Kingston Seymour
Kingston St Mary
Kingstone
Kingweston
Kingswood

Queen's
Queen Adelaide, Cambridgeshire
Queenborough, Isle of Sheppey, Kent
Queen Camel
Queen Charlton
Queen's Park, London
Queensbury
Quendon

Prince's
Princes Risborough
Princetown

Scotland

King and Rìgh
 Various places called Kingshouse
 Kingdom of Fife
 Dalrigh and possibly some of the places called Dalry
 Portree (disputed)

Kingsburgh, Skye is a corruption of Cinnseaborgh, which is in turn a corruption of a Norse name.

In many places "Kin(g)" is a suffix meaning "head", an anglicisation of Ceann: Kinghorn and Kingussie, for example, are nothing to do with royal patronage.

Regis
 Cramond, formerly referred to as Cramond Regis.

Queen
 North and South Queensferry
 Queen's Park, Edinburgh

Royal
 "Royal" Deeside – location of Balmoral Castle

Former royal burghs

In Scotland a royal burgh was a burgh or incorporated town founded by, or subsequently granted, a royal charter. By 1707, when the Act of Union with England and Wales came into effect, there were 70 royal burghs. None were created after 1707, and they were formally abolished in 1975. Notwithstanding their abolition, the term is still used in many of the former burghs.

Wales

Royal
 Royal Town of Caernarfon. The status of royal borough was granted to then municipal borough of Caernarvon in August 1963. The borough was abolished in 1974 and replaced by the community of Caernarfon, to which the status of royal town was granted. Caernarfon was the site of the investiture of Charles, Prince of Wales.

Northern Ireland

Royal
 Royal Hillsborough, County Down: On 1 June 2021 Brandon Lewis, the Secretary of State for Northern Ireland, announced that the prefix "Royal" would be granted to the exurban village. The local Lisburn and Castlereagh District Council had requested this in recognition of Hillsborough Castle, the official royal residence for Northern Ireland, as well as to mark the centenary of the creation of Northern Ireland. Letters patent are to be issued later in the year to effect this. (Hillsborough borough, created in 1662, was abolished in 1840.)

See also
Borough status in the United Kingdom
Burgh
City status in the United Kingdom

References

 
Place names with royal patronage, List of UK
Place names with royal patronage
English royalty
Place names with royal patronage
UK place names with royal patronage
Royal patronage
 Places
Place names with royal patronage
Scottish royalty
Place names with royal patronage
Place names with royal patronage, List of UK